The 1970–71 season was the first season of the Local League of Iranian football. The competition was won by Taj Football Club of Tehran.

Qualifying Tournament – Region A (Kerman)

Qualifying Tournament – Region B (Rezaeieh)

Qualifying Tournament – Region C (Rasht)

Group A

Group B

Semifinals

Final 

(P) Pas Tehran and Arya Mashhad Promoted to the Group stage.

Third place play-off

Qualifying Tournament – Region D (Isfahan)

Group A

Group B

Semifinals

Final 

(P) Bargh Tehran and Taj Shiraz Promoted to the Group stage.

Third place play-off

Final Round (Amjadieh Tehran)

Group A

Group B

Semifinals 

*The match was abandoned in the 80th minute with the score at 1–1 after Persepolis walked off to protest the officiating; Taj were awarded a 3–0 victory.

Third-place match 

* Persepolis objected to the officials appointed for the match and refused to participate; therefore, the match was scratched and Taj Abadan were awarded a 3–0 victory.

Final

Final Standings

Top goalscorers 

7 goals
  Hossein Kalani (Persepolis)

References 
 Iran 1970

Iran
1970–71 in Iranian football